John N. Hagan (August 4, 1873 – June 4, 1952) was a North Dakota Republican/NPL politician who served as the North Dakota Commissioner of Agriculture and Labor from 1917 to 1921 and from 1937 to 1938. He is one of three politicians in the state ever to be recalled; he was recalled during his first time in the office along with fellow NPL politicians Governor of North Dakota Lynn J. Frazier and North Dakota Attorney General William Lemke in 1921.

Notes

1873 births
1952 deaths
North Dakota Commissioners of Agriculture and Labor
North Dakota Republicans
Recalled American politicians